Aspidelaps is a genus of venomous elapid snakes endemic to Africa. Species in the genus Aspidelaps are commonly called shield-nosed cobras, African coral snakes or coral cobras after their cobra hoods and enlarged rostral (nose) scales. However, the hood is not nearly as well developed in Aspidelaps as it is in the true cobras of the genus Naja.

Species

Venom
Aspidelaps venom is neurotoxic, and Aspidelaps bites have caused human deaths in a few cases.

References

External links

Further reading
Boulenger GA (1896). Catalogue of the Snakes in the British Museum (Natural History). Volume III., Containing the Colubridæ (Opisthoglyphae and Proteroglyphæ) ... London: Trustees of the British Museum (Natural History). (Taylor and Francis, printers). xiv + 727 pp. + Plates I-XXV. (Genus Aspidelaps, p. 390).
Branch, Bill (2004). Field Guide to Snakes and other Reptiles of Southern Africa. Third Revised Edition, Second impression. Sanibel Island, Florida: Ralph Curtis Books. 399 pp. (Genus Aspidelaps, p. 103).
Fitzinger L (1843). Systema Reptilium, Fasciculus Primus, Amblyglossae. Vienna: Braumüller & Seidel. 106 pp. + indices. (Aspidelaps, new genus, p. 28). (in Latin).

 
Snake genera
 
 
Taxa named by Leopold Fitzinger